This is a list of substances or materials generally considered discredited.

A substance can be discredited in one of three ways:

It was widely believed to exist at one time but no longer is. Such substances are often part of an obsolete scientific theory.
It was once believed to have drastically different properties from those accepted now. It was widely claimed and believed to possess significant properties that are no longer attributed to it.
It is currently believed to exist as part of a theory that has not met the theoretical and experimental requirements of mainstream science. In particular, such a theory must be predictive.

Substances whose existence is discredited

Substances whose properties are discredited
This is not to be construed as implying that these items––are discredited. What is listed are fire, water, metal, etc. as universal principles or fundamentals.
 Classical elements and Chinese elements Discredited by atomic theory and nuclear physics.
 Fire (classical element)
 Water (classical element)
 Earth (classical element)
 Air (classical element)
 Wood (classical element)
 Metal (classical element)
 Aether (classical element): Now known not to exist (see above)
 The four bodily humours: Blood, Phlegm, Black Bile, & Yellow Bile. Fluids believed to determine health and character. Discredited by modern biology, including discovery of hormones.
 The tria prima of Paracelsus and later alchemy: Salt, Mercury and Sulphur. Discredited by modern chemistry (the atomic theory and modern understanding of elements and compounds).

See also
List of fictional elements, materials, isotopes and subatomic particles

References

Obsolete scientific theories
Chemistry-related lists
Pseudoscience